Tony Ross is a former Republican member of the Wyoming Senate for the 4th district, encompassing Laramie County.

Biography
Tony Ross was born on February 5, 1953, in Cheyenne, Wyoming. He received a Bachelor of Science from the University of Puget Sound and a J.D. from the University of Wyoming College of Law.

He served in the Wyoming House of Representatives from 1995 to 2004. In 2005, he was elected to the Wyoming Senate. He served as the Senate Majority Floor Leader in the 2011 to 2012 term and Senate Vice President in the 2009 to 2010 term.

He is married to Sandy Ross, and they have two children. He is a Christian.

References

1953 births
Living people
Presidents of the Wyoming Senate
Republican Party Wyoming state senators
Republican Party members of the Wyoming House of Representatives
University of Wyoming alumni
Politicians from Cheyenne, Wyoming
21st-century American politicians